University of Sistan and Baluchestan is an Iranian public university headquartered in Zahedan, Sistan and Baluchestan province, Iran. The second largest university of Iran, it is the largest university of the province. It has two campuses in Iranshahr and Chabahar.

History
The University of Sistan and Baluchestan was founded in 1974 originally named University of Sistan and Baluchestan in Zahedan with initial opening of the Faculty of Engineering and enrolments in Road and Construction Engineering. It did not take long for the university to become a higher education hub in the region. The next expansions were the Faculty of Nautical Science in Chabahar in 1978, the faculty of Agriculture in Zahedan in 1978 (later moved to Zabol), and the Faculty of Basic Science in Zahedan in 1989.

In 1991, Zahedan Teacher Training University was merged with the University of Sistan and Baluchestan, followed by the establishment of several other faculties, including Economics and Management, Fine Arts, Iranshahr Teacher Training, Earth Science and Geography, Educational Science and Psychology, and Computer and Information Technology.

One of the success stories of the University of Sistan and Baluchestan, due to its high achievements and potentials, is the birth of two independent universities from it — Zabol University in 1998 and University of Chabahar in 2002.

University of Sistan and Baluchestan is Iran's second largest university after University of Tehran and ranks as grade A by the Iranian Ministry of Science and Education.

Faculties

The university has 13 faculties:

International campus
University of Sistan and Baluchistan with 39 years experience in higher education is a comprehensive and successful university that plays a focal role in higher education and research in southeast Iran. In line with its main objectives, postgraduate programs have been developed in most departments with many now offering PhD programs. Opening of the Chabahar International Campus has been a step toward involvement of the university in the international higher education arena. This will open the scientific abilities and potentials of the USB to regional and international demands. While admitting students and involving prominent academics from all over the world, national students will be able to enroll in academic programs that are offered with competent international standards. Research and educational programs at the International Campus are aimed to prepare the students for the highly competitive global business and academia.

 Agricultural Biotechnology (PhD)
 Molecular Genetics (PhD)
 Agricultural Economics (M.Sc.)
 Chemical Engineering, Process Integration (M.Sc.)
 Civil Engineering, Structural Division (PhD)
 Civil Engineering, Structural Division (M.Sc.)
 Civil Engineering, Hydraulic Structures Division (M.Sc.)
 Civil Engineering, Water Engineering Division (M.Sc.)
 Computer Science (M.Sc.)
 Economics (MA)
 Electrical Engineering, Electronics (M.Sc.)
 Information Technology Management (MA)
 Master of Business Administration (MA) with 3 majors
 Mechatronics (M.Sc.)
 Mechanics, Energy (M.Sc.)
 Biology, Genetics (M.Sc.)
 Entrepreneurship (MA)
 Geography, Tourism (MA)
 English Language, Teaching (MA)

Iranshahr Campus
This faculty was established in 1992 given a great public demand for higher education and the potentials of the region. Iran-shahr Higher Education Complex is expected to develop rapidly. The complex has been granted the basic approval for promotion to an independent university.

Research institutes

International Journals 
 Challenges in Nano and Micro Scale Science and Technology
 Economic Knowledge in Agriculture
 Geography and Development Iranian Journal
 Geography and Territorial Spatial Arrangement
 International Journal of Business and Development Studies
 International Journal of Communications and Information Technology
 International Journal of Industrial Electronics Control and Optimization
 Iranian Journal of Applied Language Studies
 Iranian Journal of Archaeological Studies
 Iranian Journal of Fuzzy Systems
 Journal of Educational Psychology Studies
 Journal of Epigenetics
 Journal of Historical Researches of Iran and Islam
 Journal of Hydrosciences and Environment
 Journal of Innovation Ecosystem
 Journal of Lyrical Literature Researches
 Journal of Natural Environmental Hazards
 Journal of Subcontinent Researches
 Public Management Researches
 Stable Economy and Sustainable Development
 Studies in Comparative Religion and Mysticism

See also
 Higher Education in Iran

External links

 University of Sistan and Baluchestan web site
 7th National Congress in Civil Engineering in University of Sistan and Baluchestan

Sis
Educational institutions established in 1974
University of Sistan and Baluchestan
Zahedan
1974 establishments in Iran
Buildings and structures in Sistan and Baluchestan Province